The Frauen DFB-Pokal 1995–96 was the 16th season of the cup competition, Germany's second-most important title in women's football. In the final which was held in Berlin on 25 May 1996 FSV Frankfurt defeated Klinge Seckach 2–1, thus winning their fifth cup title and defending their title from the previous season.

First round

Several clubs had byes in the first round. Those clubs were automatically qualified for the 2nd round of the cup.

Second round

Third round

Quarter-finals

Semi-finals

Final

References 

DFB-Pokal Frauen seasons
Pokal
Fra